TN2 or TN-2 may refer to:
 Tennessee's 2nd congressional district
 Tennessee State Route 2
 TN status, a special immigration status in the United States
 TN2, a postcode district in Tunbridge Wells, England; see TN postcode area
 TN2, a student-run magazine at Trinity College Dublin